Maria dalle Carceri (died 1323) was sovereign marchioness of Bodonitsa from 1311 until 1323. She succeeded her late spouse  Albert Pallavicini on his death in 1311. While she avoided submitting her principality to the Catalan Company, she could not avoid paying an annual tribute of four destriers.

Maria was descended from a Lombard family of Verona that had come to Greece on the Fourth Crusade. She was a daughter of Gaetano dalle Carceri and heiress of a sixth of Euboea. She married Albert and their daughter Guglielma split the inheritance with her. Considering the recent Catalan victory at Halmyros, Maria desired to marry again quickly to a man who would protect hers and her daughter's possessions. She married Andrea Cornaro and Guglielma inherited the whole marquisate on his death.

Sources
 
Setton, Kenneth M. (general editor) A History of the Crusades: Volume III — The Fourteenth and Fifteenth Centuries. Harry W. Hazard, editor. University of Wisconsin Press: Madison, 1975.

1323 deaths
Christians of the Crusades
Maria
House of Cornaro
Triarchs of Negroponte
Year of birth unknown
14th-century women rulers
14th-century Venetian people
14th-century Italian women
14th-century Greek women
14th-century Greek people
Maria